Mohammad Akbar Lone (born 17 February 1947) is an Indian politician who serves the state of Jammu and Kashmir and belongs to the National Conference political party. He was elected Speaker of Jammu and Kashmir Legislative Assembly in 2008. He was made Cabinet Minister in the Omar Abdullah Government on 15 January 2013 and was given portfolio of Minister in-charge of Higher Education.

In 2019, he won the Lok Sabha seat from Baramulla, in a four-cornered contest involving the PDP, BJP, Congress and five other candidates.

After the Union government revoked the special status of Jammu and Kashmir, he teamed up with fellow Lok Sabha MP, Justice Hasnain Masoodi, to file a write petition in the Supreme Court challenging the constitutionality of the revocation.

References

1947 births
Jammu & Kashmir National Conference politicians
Members of the Jammu and Kashmir Legislative Council
State cabinet ministers of Jammu and Kashmir
Jammu and Kashmir MLAs 2014–2018
India MPs 2019–present
People from Baramulla district
Jammu and Kashmir MLAs 2002–2008
Jammu and Kashmir MLAs 2008–2014